Conor Ekundayo Okus (born 15 September 1991) is an English footballer who plays as a midfielder.

Okus started his career at the age of ten as a youngster with West Ham United and signed a scholarship for the club in 2008. In 2010 Okus was released by West Ham and went on to sign a two-year professional contract with Dagenham & Redbridge. Okus spent time on loan at a number of Conference South teams including Thurrock, Havant & Waterlooville and helped Ebbsfleet United F.C gain promotion during a 3-month loan spell in the 2010–2011 season.

In March 2012 Okus left Dagenham & Redbridge by mutual consent. The following year Okus had a short stay at Isthmian League club Brentwood Town.

A move to the North East has seen Okus sign for Durham City in summer 2015 before moving on to sign for Washington.

References

1991 births
Living people
Footballers from the London Borough of Barking and Dagenham
English footballers
Association football midfielders
West Ham United F.C. players
Dagenham & Redbridge F.C. players
Thurrock F.C. players
Ebbsfleet United F.C. players
Havant & Waterlooville F.C. players
Brentwood Town F.C. players
Durham City A.F.C. players
Washington F.C. players
English Football League players
National League (English football) players